Jin-woo is a Korean masculine given name. Its meaning differs based on the hanja used to write each syllable of the name.

Hanja
There are 43 hanja with the reading "jin" and 41 hanja with the reading "woo" on the South Korean government's official list of hanja which may be registered for use in given names. Ways of writing this name in hanja include:

: "treasured friend"
: "true friend". These characters are also used to write the Japanese given name Masatomo.
: "true home"

People
People with this name include:

Political figures
Song Jin-woo (journalist) (1889–1945), Korean journalist and independence activist
O Jin-u (1917–1995), North Korean soldier and politician
Stephen Jin-Woo Kim (born 1967), South Korean-born American man imprisoned for disclosing classified information to a journalist

Sportspeople
Song Jin-woo (born 1966), South Korean left-handed baseball pitcher (Korea Professional Baseball)
Kim Jin-woo (footballer) (born 1975), South Korean football coach and former midfielder (K-League Classic)
Lee Jin-woo (footballer) (born 1982), South Korean football forward (Korea National League)
Hwang Jin-woo (born 1983), South Korean auto racing driver
Kim Jin-woo (baseball) (born 1983), South Korean right-handed baseball pitcher (Korea Professional Baseball)
Kim Jin-Woo (swimmer) (born 1983), Kenyan swimmer of Korean descent
Park Jin-woo (volleyball) (born 1990), South Korean volleyball player
Lim Jin-woo (born 1993), South Korean football defender (J2 League)

Entertainers
Jung Jin-woo (born 1938), South Korean film director
Lee Jin-woo (actor) (born 1969), South Korean actor
Jinu (born Kim Jin-woo, 1971), American rapper of Korean descent, member of music duo Jinusean
Kim Jin-woo (actor) (born 1983), South Korean actor
Park Jin-woo (born 1983), South Korean actor
Kim Jin-woo (musician) (born 1991), South Korean singer, member of boy band Winner
Park Jin-woo (born 1996), also known as Jinjin, South Korean singer, member of boy band Astro

Other
Jung Jin-woo (born 1938), South Korean film director
Nam Jin-woo (born 1960), South Korean poet
Cheon Jinwoo (born 1962), South Korean chemist

See also
List of Korean given names

References

Korean masculine given names